Aaron Fechter (born December 21, 1953) is an American engineering entrepreneur, voice actor, singer and musician who owns and operates Creative Engineering, Inc. (CEI). A dispute with Showbiz along with the chain's dwindling revenue led to the show's decline and eventual removal. CEI developed other products and concepts since its founding, but they failed to gain commercial interest. Fechter also claims to have been instrumental in the early development of the Whac-A-Mole arcade game from Bandai, which became popular in the late 1970s, but his involvement has been disputed.

Early life and career
Aaron Fechter graduated from Edgewater High School in Orlando, Florida. In 1973, he graduated from college at the age of 19. The United States was in the midst of an energy crisis, and Fechter decided to build a fuel-efficient, small car prototype in hopes of eventually manufacturing the vehicle under a new car company. He founded Creative Engineering Incorporated (CEI) in 1975 for that purpose, but in order to raise money for the project, he resorted to selling smaller inventions door-to-door, such as his "Leaf Eater" contraption that collected leaves from swimming pools. Fechter knocked on the door of an individual who solicited his help in designing an electronic control system for a shooting gallery, designed for sale to amusement parks. The gallery featured an animatronic horse, and his success led to other offers in the animatronic industry, which became the central focus for Creative Engineering.

Fechter's father was an early investor in CEI, helping it enter the animatronic industry. Early projects included The Scab, a single talking head, Willie Wabbit, an anthropomorphic rabbit, and a fortune-telling machine called Lazlo The Great. By 1978, Fechter had finished work on the "Wolf Pack 5", his first animatronic series featuring multiple characters including The Wolfman, Fats, Dingo Starr, Beach Bear, and Queenie the Fox (later changed to a mouse and renamed Mitzi Mozzarella). It was showcased and deemed a success at the 1978 IAAPA show. He completed work on another animatronic show called "The Hard Luck Bears", featuring a hillbilly band of bears and a mimicking bird, which debuted at the IAAPA in 1979.

Fechter combined elements from both shows to form "The Rock-afire Explosion", which debuted at the second Showbiz Pizza location in 1980, the first Showbiz location (which had opened the same year), featured the Wolf Pack 5.

Showbiz Pizza Place
In 1980, Robert L. Brock opened the first ShowBiz Pizza Place restaurant in Kansas City, Missouri, featuring Creative Engineering's Wolf Pack 5 display. Although ShowBiz wanted the "Rock-afire Explosion" (RAE) concept, RAE was still in the final stages of development when the first store opened. The pizza chain also featured other amenities including an arcade and restaurant tailored to accommodate both children and adults. Brock owned an extensive chain of Holiday Inn hotels, considered the largest of its kind at the time. He originally partnered with Pizza Time Theatre but backed out after discovering Aaron Fechter's work. CEI was given a 20-percent ownership stake in the chain and retained all rights to characters, animation, and show development. Queenie the Fox was converted into a mouse and became briefly known as Mini Mozzarella at the first location. Her name was changed a final time to Mitzi Mozzarella as ShowBiz expanded and utilized RAE in future locations.

Concept Unification
Following financial troubles in the mid-1980s, Showbiz explored the possibility of reverse-engineering RAE and producing their own shows. This led to a feud over rights with CEI that lasted for several years. Showbiz eventually stripped RAE of existing cosmetics, including facial and body features, and replaced them with Chuck E. Cheese (CEC) characters, the rights to which Showbiz had  obtained in its purchase of the bankrupt CEC franchise. The transition began in 1990 under the label "Concept Unification", which involved the renaming of all Showbiz locations to Chuck E. Cheese's Pizza. A new show called "Munch's Make Believe Band" was installed in various locations. Showbiz and CEI eventually agreed on allowed CEI to license the RAE band and characters to other businesses, but the presence of CEI's animatronics within Showbiz-owned restaurants was retired by the mid-1990s.

Post Showbiz era

During CEI's involvement with Showbiz, the company pursued other interests outside of the restaurant industry. They explored the production of toys, including Billy Bob, Fatz, and Mitzi animatronic dolls that had the ability to play pre-recorded showtapes, narrate fairytales, and connect to an Apple computer for custom programmability.

CEI invested $1.5 million in research and development of a secure messaging device called the Anti-Gravity Freedom Machine, capable of sending electronic messages over a phone line. By 1998, however, web-based email had gained traction, and the project went unreleased.

In 1996, animation from the New RAE was used in a karaoke game shown at the IAAPA. In 1997, Looney Bird's was a new restaurant that housed the classic RAE, but one Looney Bird's Markets used "The New Rock-Afire Explosion" show. As with The New Rock-Afire, "Marvelously Electronic Animation" debuted as a karaoke, trivia and video recording area that features a NRAE Looney Bird Robot that is controlled with The Anti-Gravity Freedom Machine. In 2000, CEI developed The Mezmerizer, an arcade game licensed for manufacture to ICE that evolved into their Wheel of Fortune game. The Starlauncher, developed in 2003 as "an American Idol kiosk," was never publicly released.

Carbohydrillium project
In 2010, research began on an alternative cooking fuel derived from graphite and water called Carbohydrillium, billed as safer and less polluting than propane. On September 26, 2013, catastrophic failure of high-pressure carbon steel canisters lead to an explosion at a Creative Engineering warehouse in Orlando. Investigation revealed that Richardson had experienced a similar explosion in 2001 while working on an earlier incarnation of the product he called Aqualux.

In media and pop culture
Interest in The Rock-Afire Explosion surged in 2005 with the release of several YouTube videos, such as "Ms. New Booty" by Chris Thrash, in which a fan recreated several new RAE animations depicting modern musical themes. The efforts were displayed in the 2008 The Rock-afire Explosion Documentary. 

Creative Engineering continued to sell Rock-afire merchandise online over the years. In 2014, indie game developer Scott Cawthon released Five Nights at Freddy's, featuring a family restaurant setting inspired in part by Chuck E. Cheese and Showbiz Pizza Place. In the game, a single player tries to evade possessed animatronics.

In 2015, CEI released an arcade game to the IAAPA convention called Bashy Bug (stylized as BASHyBUG) that revolves around a flipflop shoe used by the player to stomp on a bug in a timed skill scenario with multiple levels of difficulty.
		
In the 2016 film Keanu, by Keegan-Michael Key and Jordan Peele, a cat named Keanu jumps through the window of a fictional, abandoned building that used to manufacture animatronics. CEI characters such as Beach Bear, Billy Bob, and Fatz appear in the background.

References

External links
 Creative's Official Website
 ShowBiz Pizza/Rock-afire fan Website
 The Rock-afire Documentary Online
 PopRewind's 2012 interview of Aaron Fechter
 2015 interview with Aaron Fechter

20th-century American inventors
American engineers
Animatronic engineers
American male musicians
American male voice actors
Living people
1953 births
University of South Florida alumni
Place of birth missing (living people)